Skyreholme is a hamlet in Wharfedale in the Yorkshire Dales, North Yorkshire, England. Parcevall Hall is at the north end of the hamlet, and Skyreholme Beck flows through the limestone gorge of Trollers Gill just to the north.

The toponym, first recorded in 1540, is of Old Norse origin, from skírr "bright" and holmr "water-meadow", and so means "bright water-meadow".  Skyreholme was historically in the township of Appletreewick in the large ancient parish of Burnsall in the West Riding of Yorkshire.

In the early 19th century the hamlet had a substantial population (234 in the 1841 census).  The main industry was a cotton and calico mill.  To serve this population a chapel of ease was built in 1837.  The chapel closed in 1897, but from 1867 the building was also used as a school, which continued until 1967. The village is home to Parcevall Hall, a grade II listed building which has  of gardens with plants from around the world.

References

External links 

Skyreholme village website

Hamlets in North Yorkshire
Wharfedale